The Maid: A Novel is a 2022 murder mystery debut novel by Canadian author Nita Prose.

In 2021, a film adaptation of the novel was announced, with Florence Pugh cast in the lead role.

References 

2022 Canadian novels
Canadian mystery novels